Tsz Tong Tsuen is a village of Hong Kong, located in Lung Yeuk Tau, Fanling, North District. It is one of the Five Wai (walled villages) and Six Tsuen (villages) in Lung Yeuk Tau.

Administration
Tsz Tong Tsuen is a recognized village under the New Territories Small House Policy. It is one of the villages represented within the Fanling District Rural Committee. For electoral purposes, Tsz Tong Tsuen is part of the Queen's Hill constituency, which is currently represented by Law Ting-tak.

History
Tsz Tong Tsuen was founded in the early 14th century by a member of the Tang Clan lineage of Kam Tin.

See also
 Tang Chung Ling Ancestral Hall, located between Tsz Tong Tsuen and Lo Wai.

References

External links

 Delineation of area of existing village Tsz Tong Tsuen (Fanling) for election of resident representative (2019 to 2022)

Villages in North District, Hong Kong
Lung Yeuk Tau